William Schulhoff (March 19, 1898 – August 2, 1943) was an American painter. His work was part of the painting event in the art competition at the 1932 Summer Olympics.

References

1898 births
1943 deaths
20th-century American painters
American male painters
Olympic competitors in art competitions
20th-century American male artists